My Cousin from Warsaw is a 1931 French-German comedy film directed by Carmine Gallone and starring Elvire Popesco, André Roanne and Madeleine Lambert. The film's screenplay was adapted by Henri-Georges Clouzot. A separate German-language version was also made.

The film's art direction was by Julius von Borsody.

Cast
 Elvire Popesco as Sonia Varilovna
 André Roanne as Hubert
 Madeleine Lambert as Lucienne
 Gustave Gallet as Archibald Burel
 Pierre Noyelle as Toby
 Sylvette Fillacier as Rosalie
 Carlos Avril as Joseph
 Jean-Marie de l'Isle as The doctor Ma cousine de Varsovie
 Saturnin Fabre as Saint-Hilaire

Release
The film was screened in Paris on 10 April 1931.

References

Bibliography

External links 
 

1931 films
1931 comedy films
French comedy films
German comedy films
1930s French-language films
Films directed by Carmine Gallone
French films based on plays
German films based on plays
Films based on works by Louis Verneuil
German multilingual films
French black-and-white films
French multilingual films
Films with screenplays by Henri-Georges Clouzot
Films with screenplays by Franz Schulz
Cine-Allianz films
German black-and-white films
1931 multilingual films
1930s French films
1930s German films